Turn the World Around is an album by Harry Belafonte, released in 1977.

After recording exclusively for  the RCA Victor label since 1953, Belafonte signed with Columbia Records in the mid 1970s. After a series of pop-oriented albums, Turn the World Around was a return to interpreting folk songs of other cultures. Gary Ginell stated in his AllMusic review: "It is an absolute triumph and one of the finest albums of his career." Although recorded in the US, it was only released overseas.

The title track became the focus of one of the most acclaimed performances on the successful television series, The Muppet Show, where Belafonte explained the artistic theme of the song before performing it with specially designed Muppets that resembled African tribal masks:

Series producer Jim Henson considered this production to be his best work on the series, and featured it in numerous retrospectives of his art; Belafonte performed the song again at Henson's memorial service in 1990.

Track listing
 "Marching to the Fair" (Morris Goldberg, Shunmugan Pillay) – 5:44
 "Auntie Mary" (Count Bernadino) – 4:32
 "Olga" (Fitzroy Alexander) – 3:48
 "Goin' Down Jordan" (Theophilus Woods, Irving Burgie) – 5:34
 "Sunbird" (Pat Rosalia, Robert McKinnon) – 4:05
 "New York Taxi" (Fitzroy Alexander) – 5:38
 "Can't Cross Over" (Irving Burgie) – 4:44
 "A Hole in the Bucket" (Harry Belafonte, Odetta) – 8:46
 "Turn The World Around" (Belafonte, Robert Freedman) – 4:28

Personnel
Harry Belafonte – vocals
Falumi Prince – percussion, vocals on "A Hole in the Bucket & Auntie Mary"
Dom Salvador – keyboards, musical director
Keith Loving – guitar
Scott Kuney – guitar
Thelmo M. Porto – percussion
Nana – percussion
Dom Um Romão – percussion
Steve Thornton – conga, bongos
Brian Moore – keyboards
Michael Tobas – drums
Francisco Centeno – bass
Gloria Agostini – harp
Mauricio Smith – flute, saxophone
Hal Archer – flute, saxophone
Leopoldo Pineda – trombone
Jose Rodrigues – trombone
Howard Johnson – tuba
Danny Cahn – trumpet
Fred Jacobs – trumpet
Babe Clarke – alto saxophone
Larry Campbell – background vocals
Vivian C. Cherry – background vocals
Melvin Edmonston – background vocals
Babi B. Floyd – background vocals
Frank Floyd – background vocals
Lani Groves – background vocals
Milton Grayson – background vocals
Hilda Harris – background vocals
Pamela Kordon – background vocals
Yvonne Lewis – background vocals
Yolanda McCullough – background vocals
Randy Peyton – background vocals
Albertine Robinson – background vocals
Maeretha A. Stewart – background vocals
Gloria Turner – background vocals
Betty Volenec – background vocals
Arthur Williams – background vocals
Production notes:
Harry Belafonte – producer
Coleridge-Taylor Perkinson – vocal arrangements
Kurt Munkacsi – engineer
Vishek Woszczyk – mixing
Eric Meola – photography
Ed Lee – design

References

1977 albums
Harry Belafonte albums
Columbia Records albums